Maharani is a 2009 soap opera that aired Monday through Friday on Vijay TV from 19 October 2009 to 4 November 2011 for 492 episodes. It is a remake of the Malayalam language serial Ente Manasaputhri that was aired on Asianet.

This is a story of two best friends (Sujitha and Archana) who turn out to be enemies. The show starred Sujitha, Archana, Praveena and Sulakshana among others. It was director by Baiju Deveraj.

Plot
Maharani is a story of two young girls named Mahalakshmi (Sujitha) and Rani (Archana) who are brought up in an orphanage. Maha is calm, shy and a very simple person. Whereas Rani is smart and tries to outwit others with her villainous plots. The orphanage follows a certain system, where for all those who attain 18 years of age will be married to some suitable persons. Such an initiative is always taken by the orphanage owners for every person belonging to the orphanage. Rani always dreams of a very luxurious and luminous life in the outside world. Maha with her simplicity and clear focus in life tries to overcome all her problems independently! But will she tackle more issues created by Rani too?

Cast
Archana Suseelan as Rani
 Sujitha as Mahalakshmi (Maha)
 Praveena as Sandhya
 Sulakshana as Yamuna
Sreenath / Murali Mohan as Devraj
 Sathish as Prakash
M. B. Padmakumar as Thopiyas
 Chitra Shenoy as Prakash's mother
 Arya Rohit as Suja
 Katam Reddy
 Srilekha
Sreekala as Servant

Adaptations

References

External links

Official website

Star Vijay original programming
Tamil-language romance television series
2009 Tamil-language television series debuts
Tamil-language television shows
2011 Tamil-language television series endings
Tamil-language television series based on Malayalam-language television series